Mount Jerai, formerly Kedah Peak, is a mountain in Kedah, Malaysia with the height of . Within Kedah itself, the mountain stands at the border of Kuala Muda and Yan districts. The mountain is a massive limestone outcrop and is a lone feature from the surrounding geography of the area. There is an information board on top of the mountain stating that it used to be an island called Pulai Serai before the sea levels receded letting it form a mountain. This is probably supported by I Ching's record of Pu Lou Shi (Pulau Sri), a country located west of Sribogha.

Mount Jerai is known as the hausberg of the town of Sungai Petani, the district capital of Kuala Muda.

See also
 List of mountains in Malaysia
 Geography of Malaysia

References

Kuala Muda District
Landforms of Kedah
Jerai
Yan District